Wladimir de Terlikowski or Włodzimierz Terlikowski (1873–1951) was a Polish painter mainly active in France.

Life
Born to a noble family near Warsaw, he discovered art on several trips to France, Italy, Spain, Germany, Switzerland and North Africa. After short periods studying in the academy of fine arts in Munich and the Parisian studio of Jean-Paul Laurens, Terlikowski's first works were close to Fauvism and got him noticed by the galerie Galerie Bernheim-Jeune. Terlikowski set up a studio in Montparnasse, where he was a contemporary of Modigliani, Soutine, Picasso, Derain and Vlaminck.

Exhibitions
 Exposition Władimir de Terlikowski (21 April - 3 May 1913), Chez MM Bernheim-Jeune 
 L'art polonais en France, paysages du Morbihan (20 November - 2 December 1916), Chez MM Bernheim-Jeune
 Exposition W. de Terlikowski: Venise, Paris, Provence - Hotel Charpentier - 21 April-19 May 1927
 Wladimir de Terlikowski: May–June 1981, Troyes, Centre culturel Thibaud de Champagne
 Wladimir de Terlikowski : June–October 2002, Musée des Peintres de l'Ecole de Murol - 63 Murol
 Wladimir de Terlikowski : February 2012, Bibliothèque Polonaise de Paris - 75004 Paris

Museums exhibiting his works 
 Musée National d'Art Moderne - Centre national d'art et de culture Georges-Pompidou
 Musée des beaux-arts de Bordeaux
 Musée des beaux-arts de Troyes
 Musée de Murol

Bibliography
 Arsène Alexandre, "W. de Terlikowski Peintre, éditions Alcan, Paris, 1927
 Jan-Topass, "W de Terlikowski" Editions "Le Triangle" Paris 1930
 Arsène Alexandre "Terlikowski" Peintre de Figures, copyright by A. Alexandre, 1934
 Wladimir de Terlikowski: his life and art'', Par Bennard B. Perlman, Martha Walker Fullington, éditions W. Vance Brown II, 1998

References

19th-century Polish painters
19th-century Polish male artists
20th-century Polish painters
20th-century Polish male artists
1951 deaths
1873 births
Polish male painters